James Allan Anderson OBE (born 14 April 1963) is a Scottish swimmer.

Swimming career
Anderson has represented Great Britain at the Paralympic Games on six occasions, in 1992, 1996, 2000, 2004, 2008 and the 2012 Summer Paralympics. He has won six Paralympic gold medals, four at the 2004 Games, in the 50 m, 100 m and 200 m freestyle and the 50 m backstroke events, and two at the 1996 Games in the 50 m backstroke and 100 m freestyle races. He has also set two world records and four European records. He also competed at the 2008 Paralympics in Beijing. He was selected again for the 2012 Paralympics in London, finishing fourth in the S2 class final of the 50m backstroke and eighth in the S2 100m freestyle.

Honours
In 2004, Anderson was awarded the BBC Scotland Sports Personality of the Year award and was appointed Member of the Order of the British Empire (MBE) in the 2005 New Year Honours. He was promoted to Officer of the Order of the British Empire (OBE) in the 2009 Birthday Honours.

Personal life
Anderson has cerebral palsy. He is also a former British Wheelchair Disco champion. He was born in St Andrews, Fife and resides in Broxburn.

Footnotes

External links
 
 
 James Anderson OBE at British Swimming

1963 births
Living people
Scottish male freestyle swimmers
Scottish disabled sportspeople
Swimmers with cerebral palsy
Paralympic swimmers of Great Britain
Paralympic gold medalists for Great Britain
Paralympic silver medalists for Great Britain
Paralympic bronze medalists for Great Britain
Swimmers at the 1992 Summer Paralympics
Swimmers at the 1996 Summer Paralympics
Swimmers at the 2000 Summer Paralympics
Swimmers at the 2004 Summer Paralympics
Swimmers at the 2008 Summer Paralympics
Swimmers at the 2012 Summer Paralympics
Medalists at the 1992 Summer Paralympics
Medalists at the 1996 Summer Paralympics
Medalists at the 2000 Summer Paralympics
Medalists at the 2004 Summer Paralympics
Medalists at the 2008 Summer Paralympics
Cerebral Palsy category Paralympic competitors
Officers of the Order of the British Empire
World record holders in paralympic swimming
Sportspeople from St Andrews
Medalists at the World Para Swimming European Championships
Paralympic medalists in swimming
S2-classified Paralympic swimmers